Abacetus grandis is a species of ground beetle in the subfamily Pterostichinae. It was described by Laferte-Senectere in 1853.

References

grandis
Beetles described in 1853